East Acton is a London Underground station in East Acton in London Borough of Hammersmith and Fulham. The station is on the Central line, between White City and North Acton stations, and in Travelcard Zone 2. Wormwood Scrubs, Queen Charlotte's and Chelsea Hospital, Hammersmith Hospital, Wormwood Scrubs prison and Imperial College Hammersmith branch are accessible from the station.

Location
The station is located on Erconwald Street and is near the A40 Western Avenue connected via Old Oak Common Lane,  from the centre of East Acton. Wormwood Scrubs, Queen Charlotte's and Chelsea Hospital, Hammersmith Hospital, HM Prison Wormwood Scrubs and Imperial College Hammersmith branch are accessible from the station.

History

In 1905, the Great Western Railway (GWR) proposal to construct the Ealing & Shepherd's Bush Railway (E&SBR) so that it would connect its main line route at Ealing Broadway to the West London Railway (WLR) north of Shepherd's Bush was approved by Parliament. Construction had not started and in 1911, the Central London Railway (CLR, now part of the Central line) and GWR agreed running powers for CLR services to continue from Shepherd's Bush to Ealing Broadway using the GWR route. The CLR request for a short extension from Wood Lane to connect to the E&SBR tracks gained parliamentary approval on 18 August 1911 under the Central London Railway Act, 1911. The GWR constructed the new E&SBR line. Electrification of the track did not begin until after the end of the First World War. When complete, CLR services started on  1920 where East Acton was opened as the only intermediate station.

Since the CLR was exclusively a passenger service, two extra dedicated tracks for the GWR's freight trains were opened in 1938, but were closed in 1964. The trackbed of these rails is now overgrown with vegetation, visible immediately to the north of the station.

Improvements and closures
The tracks at East Acton were replaced in 2005 which saw a partial closure of the line from West Ruislip or Ealing Broadway to White City between 13 and 14 August 2005. In 2007, the station was refurbished by Metronet.

From August 2021, the eastbound platform was rebuilt. During the works eastbound Central line trains (towards central London) and all Night Tube trains did not stop at East Acton. Originally planned to last five months until December 2021, it was discovered that structural elements required full replacement rather than repair and the platforms did not reopen until 19 September 2022.

Services and connections

Services
East Acton is served by the Central line between North Acton and White City. To the east, the two tracks change direction to continue to White City.

The typical off-peak service in trains per hour (tph) is:
9 tph eastbound to Epping
3 tph eastbound to Loughton
6 tph eastbound to Hainault via Newbury Park
3 tph eastbound to Woodford via Hainault
9 tph westbound to West Ruislip
3 tph westbound to Northolt
9 tph westbound to Ealing Broadway

Night Tube services also serve the station, with a frequency of 3 tph in both directions.

Connections
London Buses routes 7, 70, 72, 95, 228, 260, 272 and 283, and Night Bus route N7 serve the station.

Notes and references

Notes

References

Bibliography

 
 
 

Central line (London Underground) stations
London Underground Night Tube stations
Tube stations in the London Borough of Hammersmith and Fulham
Former Great Western Railway stations
Railway stations in Great Britain opened in 1920
Acton, London